The Canadian Entomologist is a bimonthly peer-reviewed scientific journal covering all aspects of entomology. It is published by Cambridge University Press on behalf of  the Entomological Society of Canada and was established in 1868. Volumes 1 to 54 are freely accessible in the Biodiversity Heritage Library. According to the Journal Citation Reports, the journal has a 2020 impact factor of 0.878.

References

External links 
 

Entomology journals and magazines
Bimonthly journals
Cambridge University Press academic journals
English-language journals
French-language journals
Multilingual journals
Publications established in 1868
Academic journals associated with learned and professional societies of Canada